The 2022 KBO League season was the 41st season in the history of the KBO League. The regular season began on April 2 and ended on October 11. A postseason then followed, culminating with the championship Korean Series. KT Wiz entered the season as defending champions.

Season format
No changes were made to the league's makeup from the prior season, with the same 10 teams competing. Each team is scheduled to play 144 games, via facing every other team 16 times.

The league announced some operational changes:
 If two teams are tied for the final playoff spot (5th place), the teams will play a single-game tiebreaker.
 If more than two teams are tied for the final playoff spot, mathematical tiebreakers will be used.
 The number of replay review officials used by the league was increased from three to five (one per game).
 Games will only be canceled (such as due to COVID-19 effects) if a team is unable to dress 28 players.

Additionally, some temporary measures used during the prior season, such as not playing extra innings, were discontinued.

Standings
Last updated October 12, 2022

Note: Regular-season games are limited to 12 innings; tie results are ignored by the league when computing winning percentage and games behind.

Postseason

Wild Card
The series started with a 1–0 advantage for the fourth-placed team.

Semi-playoff

Playoff

Korean Series

See also
2022 in baseball
2022 Major League Baseball season

References

External links
  (in Korean)
  (in English)

KBO League seasons
KBO League season
KBO League season